The following is an overview of events in 1982 in film, including the highest-grossing films, award ceremonies and festivals, a list of films released and notable deaths.

Highest-grossing films

North America

The top ten 1982 released films by box office gross in North America are as follows:

Outside North America
The highest-grossing 1982 films in countries outside of North America.

Worldwide gross revenue
The following table lists known worldwide gross revenue figures for several high-grossing films that originally released in 1982. Note that this list is incomplete and is therefore not representative of the highest-grossing films worldwide in 1982.

Events
 January 1 - Terry Semel becomes president of Warner Bros.
 June 11
 E.T. the Extra-Terrestrial is released; it became the highest-grossing film to date.
 Michelle Pfeiffer appears in her first leading role, in Grease 2, the sequel to the top-grossing film of 1978.
 June 22 – The Coca-Cola Company acquires Columbia Pictures for $750 million.
 July 9 — Sci-fi movie Tron is the first feature film to use computer animation extensively.
 July 23 — During production of Twilight Zone: The Movie, Vic Morrow and two child actors are accidentally killed during a helicopter scene, leading to reforms in filmmaking safety and child-labor laws.
 October 22 – First Blood is released to widespread commercial and critical success, launching the Rambo franchise.
 December 8 – Comedian Eddie Murphy makes his film debut in the hit 48 Hrs.
 December 17 – Tootsie is released, becoming the highest-grossing comedy to date and Columbia Pictures's highest-grossing film at $177 million.
 December 27 - Ned Tanen resigns as president of Universal Pictures. Robert Rehme becomes president of Universal's new Theatrical Motion Picture Group.
 The THX Sound System is developed for movie theaters.

Awards 

Palme d'Or (Cannes Film Festival):
Missing, directed by Costa-Gavras, United States
Yol (The Way), directed by Yılmaz Güney, Turkey

Golden Lion (Venice Film Festival):
The State of Things (Der Stand der Dinge), directed by Wim Wenders, W. Germany / Portugal / US

Golden Bear (Berlin Film Festival):
Die Sehnsucht der Veronika Voss (Veronika Voss), directed by Rainer Werner Fassbinder, W. Germany

Notable films released in 1982
United States unless stated

#
 48 Hours, directed by Walter Hill, starring Nick Nolte, Eddie Murphy, James Remar and Annette O'Toole

A
 Airplane II: The Sequel, starring Robert Hays, Julie Hagerty, Chad Everett, Raymond Burr, Sonny Bono, William Shatner
 Alice
 Alone in the Dark, starring Jack Palance and Martin Landau
 Alsino and the Condor (Alsino y el cóndor) – (Nicaragua/Mexico)
 Amityville II: The Possession, starring James Olson, Burt Young, Rutanya Alda
 Android, starring Klaus Kinski
 The Angel (L'Ange), directed by Patrick Bokanowski – (France)
 Angel, directed by Neil Jordan, starring Stephen Rea – (Ireland)
 Angoor, starring Sanjeev Kumar – (India)
 Annie, directed by John Huston, starring Aileen Quinn, Albert Finney, Carol Burnett, Bernadette Peters, Ann Reinking, Tim Curry
 Another Way (Egymásra nézve) – (Hungary)
 Aphrodite, starring Horst Buchholz, Valérie Kaprisky, Capucine – (France)
 The Atomic Cafe, a documentary film on the era of nuclear warfare
 Author! Author!, directed by Arthur Hiller, starring Al Pacino, Dyan Cannon, Tuesday Weld, Alan King

B
 La Balance (The Informer), starring Nathalie Baye and Philippe Léotard – (France)
 Barbarosa, directed by Fred Schepisi, starring Willie Nelson and Gary Busey
 Basket Case, directed by Frank Henenlotter
 The Beastmaster, starring Marc Singer – (US/West Germany)
 The Beast Within, directed by Philippe Mora, starring Ronny Cox
 Le Beau Mariage (A Good Marriage), directed by Éric Rohmer – (France)
 Best Friends, starring Burt Reynolds, Goldie Hawn, Ron Silver, Jessica Tandy, Barnard Hughes, Keenan Wynn, Audra Lindley
 The Best Little Whorehouse in Texas, starring Burt Reynolds, Dolly Parton, Jim Nabors, Dom DeLuise, Charles Durning
 La bête lumineuse (The Shimmering Beast) – (Canada)
 Blade Runner, directed by Ridley Scott, starring Harrison Ford, Rutger Hauer, Sean Young, Edward James Olmos, Joanna Cassidy, Daryl Hannah
 Blue Island (Due gocce d'acqua salata) – (Italy)
 Boat People (Tau ban no hoi), directed by Ann Hui – (Hong Kong/China)
 The Border, directed by Tony Richardson, starring Jack Nicholson, Harvey Keitel, Warren Oates, Valerie Perrine
 Brimstone and Treacle, starring Denholm Elliott, Joan Plowright, Sting – (U.K.)
 Britannia Hospital, directed by Lindsay Anderson, starring Leonard Rossiter – (U.K.)
 Bugs Bunny's 3rd Movie: 1001 Rabbit Tales
 Burden of Dreams, a documentary film featuring Werner Herzog, Claudia Cardinale, Klaus Kinski
 Butterfly, starring Pia Zadora, Stacy Keach, Orson Welles, Lois Nettleton

C
 Cannery Row, directed by David S. Ward, starring Nick Nolte and Debra Winger
 Cat People, directed by Paul Schrader, starring Nastassja Kinski, Malcolm McDowell, John Heard, Annette O'Toole
 Cecilia – (Cuba)
 Chan Is Missing, directed by Wayne Wang
 Charodei (Magicians) – (U.S.S.R.)
 Class of 1984, starring Perry King and Timothy Van Patten
 La colmena (The Beehive) – (Spain) Golden Bear (award) winner 1982
 Come Back to the Five and Dime, Jimmy Dean, Jimmy Dean, directed by Robert Altman, starring Sandy Dennis, Cher, Karen Black
 Comeback, starring Eric Burdon, Julie Carmen – (United States/West Germany)
 Conan the Barbarian, directed by John Milius, starring Arnold Schwarzenegger and James Earl Jones
 The Concrete Jungle, directed by Tom DeSimone, starring Jill St. John and Tracey E. Bregman
 Countryman – (Jamaica)
 Creepshow, directed by George A. Romero, starring Ted Danson, Leslie Nielsen, Hal Holbrook, E. G. Marshall, Adrienne Barbeau, Stephen King

D
 The Dark Crystal, a fantasy film with a cast performed by puppetry and animatronics, directed by Jim Henson and Frank Oz – (US/UK)
 Dead Men Don't Wear Plaid, directed by Carl Reiner, starring Steve Martin and Rachel Ward
 Death Wish II, starring Charles Bronson, Jill Ireland, Vincent Gardenia
 Deathtrap, directed by Sidney Lumet, starring Michael Caine, Christopher Reeve, Dyan Cannon
 Death Valley, starring Catherine Hicks and Edward Herrmann
 Diner, directed by Barry Levinson, starring Steve Guttenberg, Daniel Stern, Mickey Rourke, Kevin Bacon, Tim Daly, Ellen Barkin, Paul Reiser
 A Dog in a Drawer (Kuche v chekmedzhe) – (Bulgaria)
 Dögkeselyű (Egyptian Vulture) – (Hungary)
 The Draughtsman's Contract, directed by Peter Greenaway, starring Anthony Higgins and Janet Suzman – (U.K.)

E
 E.T. the Extra-Terrestrial, directed by Steven Spielberg, starring Henry Thomas, Dee Wallace, Peter Coyote, Robert MacNaughton, Drew Barrymore
 Eating Raoul, directed by and starring Paul Bartel
 Endangered Species, starring Robert Urich and JoBeth Williams
 The Escape Artist, starring Raúl Juliá, Griffin O'Neal, Desi Arnaz
 Evil Under the Sun, starring Peter Ustinov, Diana Rigg, Maggie Smith, James Mason, Jane Birkin, Nicholas Clay, Sylvia Miles, Roddy McDowall – (U.K.)
 Eye of the Evil Dead aka Manhattan Baby, starring Christopher Connelly, Martha Taylor (Italy)

F
 Fanny and Alexander, directed by Ingmar Bergman – (Sweden)
 Fast Times at Ridgemont High, directed by Amy Heckerling, starring Sean Penn, Jennifer Jason Leigh, Judge Reinhold, Phoebe Cates, Ray Walston
 Fast-Walking, starring James Woods
 Fighting Back, starring Tom Skerritt
 Firefox, directed by and starring Clint Eastwood
 First Blood, directed by Ted Kotcheff, starring Sylvester Stallone (as Rambo), Richard Crenna, Brian Dennehy
 Fitzcarraldo, directed by Werner Herzog, starring Klaus Kinski – (West Germany)
 The Flight of Dragons – (United States/Japan)
 Forced Vengeance, starring Chuck Norris
 Frances, starring Jessica Lange, Sam Shepard, Kim Stanley
 Friday the 13th Part III, directed by Steve Miner, starring Dana Kimmell and Richard Brooker

G
 Gandhi, directed by Richard Attenborough, starring Ben Kingsley – (India/U.K.) – Oscar, Golden Globe and BAFTA for best film
 Grease 2, starring Maxwell Caulfield and Michelle Pfeiffer
 The Grey Fox, starring Richard Farnsworth – (Canada)

H
 Halloween III: Season of the Witch, starring Tom Atkins, Stacey Nelkin
 Hammett, directed by Wim Wenders, starring Frederic Forrest, Marilu Henner, Peter Boyle
 Hanky Panky, directed by Sidney Poitier, starring Gene Wilder, Gilda Radner, Richard Widmark, Kathleen Quinlan
 Harry Tracy, Desperado, starring Bruce Dern and Helen Shaver – (Canada)
 Heart and Guts (Das Tripas Coração) – (Brazil)
 Heatwave, directed by Phillip Noyce, starring Judy Davis – (Australia)
 Heidi's Song, an animated film featuring Lorne Greene and Sammy Davis Jr.
 The Herdsman (Mù Mǎ Rén) – (China)
 Hey Good Lookin, an animated film directed by Ralph Bakshi
 Himala (Miracle) – (Philippines)
 Honkytonk Man, directed by and starring Clint Eastwood
The Hound of the Baskervilles (British) a Sherlock Holmes mystery directed by Peter Duguid, starring Tom Baker as Holmes, Terence Rigby as Watson and Will Knightley as Moriarty
 How the World Is Losing Poets (Jak svět přichází o básníky) – (Czechoslovakia)
 The Hunchback of Notre Dame, starring Anthony Hopkins, Derek Jacobi and Lesley-Anne Down – (US/UK)

I
 I Ought to Be in Pictures, directed by Herbert Ross, starring Walter Matthau, Ann-Margret, Dinah Manoff
 I, the Jury, starring Armand Assante, Barbara Carrera, Laurene Landon, Alan King
 Identification of a Woman (Identificazione di una donna), directed by Michelangelo Antonioni – (Italy)
 If You Could See What I Hear, starring Marc Singer, R.H. Thomas, Shari Belafonte, Sarah Torgov, Douglas Campbell
 If You Love This Planet – (Canada)
 I'm Dancing as Fast as I Can, starring Jill Clayburgh, Nicol Williamson, Daniel Stern, Joe Pesci, Dianne Wiest, Geraldine Page
 Inchon!, directed by Terence Young, starring Laurence Olivier, Jacqueline Bisset, Ben Gazzara, Toshiro Mifune
 Interrogation (Przesłuchanie) – (Poland)

J
 Jinxed!, starring Bette Midler, Ken Wahl, Rip Torn

K
 Kiss Me Goodbye, directed by Robert Mulligan, starring Sally Field, Jeff Bridges, James Caan, Mildred Natwick
 Koyaanisqatsi, directed by Godfrey Reggio

L
 The Last Unicorn, an animated film featuring Mia Farrow, Angela Lansbury, Alan Arkin
 Legendary Weapons of China
 Legend of a Fighter (Huo Yuan-Jia),starring Bryan Leung – (Hong Kong)
 L'Étoile du Nord (The North Star), starring Simone Signoret and Philippe Noiret – (France)
 Let's Spend the Night Together (Rolling Stones' concert film)
 Liquid Sky
 Look Isan – (Thailand)
 Lonely Hearts – (Australia)
 Lookin' to Get Out, directed by Hal Ashby, starring Ann-Margret, Jon Voight and Burt Young
 Love and Money, starring Ray Sharkey, Ornella Muti, Armand Assante
 Love Child, starring Amy Madigan and Beau Bridges

M
 Macbeth – (Hungary)
 Les Maîtres du temps (The Masters of Time) – (France)
 Making Love, directed by Arthur Hiller, starring Harry Hamlin, Michael Ontkean, Kate Jackson
 The Man from Snowy River, starring Tom Burlinson and Kirk Douglas – (Australia)
 The Marathon Family (Maratonci trče počasni krug) – (Yugoslavia)
 Megaforce, directed by Hal Needham, starring Barry Bostwick and Persis Khambatta
 A Midsummer Night's Sex Comedy, directed by and starring Woody Allen, with Mia Farrow, Julie Hagerty, Mary Steenburgen, José Ferrer
 Les Misérables, starring Lino Ventura – (France)
 Missing, directed by Costa-Gavras, starring Jack Lemmon and Sissy Spacek – Palme d'Or winner
 The Missionary, directed by Richard Loncraine, starring Michael Palin, Maggie Smith, Trevor Howard – (U.K.)
 Mitahat La'af (Under the Nose) – (Israel)
 Monkey Grip – (Australia)
 Monsignor, directed by Frank Perry, starring Christopher Reeve, Geneviève Bujold, Fernando Rey, Jason Miller
 Monty Python Live at the Hollywood Bowl – (U.K.)
 Moonlighting, directed by Jerzy Skolimowski, starring Jeremy Irons – (U.K.)
 La Morte Vivante (released as "The Living Dead Girl"), directed by Jean Rollin – (France)
 Mother Lode, directed by and starring Charlton Heston
 My Favorite Year, directed by Richard Benjamin, starring Peter O'Toole, Mark Linn-Baker, Joseph Bologna, Jessica Harper, Bill Macy, Lainie Kazan

N
 Namak Halaal, starring Amitabh Bachchan – (India)
 The Night of the Shooting Stars (La Notte di San Lorenzo), by Paolo Emilio Taviani – (Italy)
 Night Shift, directed by Ron Howard, starring Henry Winkler, Michael Keaton, Shelley Long
 Nomad (Lie huo qing chun), starring Leslie Cheung – (Hong Kong)

O
 An Officer and a Gentleman, directed by Taylor Hackford, starring Richard Gere, Debra Winger, Louis Gossett Jr., David Keith, Lisa Blount, Lisa Eilbacher, Robert Loggia
 On Top (Með allt á hreinu) – (Iceland)
 On Top of the Whale (Het Dak van de Walvis) – (Netherlands)
 One from the Heart, directed by Francis Ford Coppola, starring Teri Garr, Frederic Forrest, Nastassja Kinski, Raúl Juliá

P
 Pagliacci, directed by Franco Zeffirelli, starring Plácido Domingo – (Italy)
 Pandemonium, starring Tom Smothers, Eve Arden, Eileen Brennan, Candice Azzara, Carol Kane
 Paradise, starring Phoebe Cates and Willie Aames – (Canada)
 Partners, starring Ryan O'Neal and John Hurt
 The Passerby (La passante du Sans-Souci), starring Romy Schneider and Michel Piccoli – (France)
 Personal Best, directed by Robert Towne, starring Mariel Hemingway, Patrice Donnelly, Scott Glenn
 Pieces (original title: Mil gritos tiene la noche translation: 'A Thousand Screams in the Night'), directed by Juan Piquer Simón
 Pink Floyd – The Wall, directed by Alan Parker, starring Bob Geldof – (U.K.)
 The Pirate Movie, starring Christopher Atkins and Kristy McNichol – (Australia)
 The Plague Dogs, an animated film featuring John Hurt, James Bolam and Nigel Hawthorne – (U.K.)
 The Pokrovsky Gate (Pokrovskiye Vorota) – (U.S.S.R.)
 Poltergeist, directed by Tobe Hooper, starring Craig T. Nelson, JoBeth Williams, Dominique Dunne, Heather O'Rourke, Oliver Robins, Zelda Rubinstein, Beatrice Straight
 The Pool Hustlers (Io, Chiara e lo Scuro) – (Italy)
 Private Life (Chastnaya zhizn) – (U.S.S.R.)

Q
 Q, starring Michael Moriarty, Richard Roundtree, Candy Clark
 The Queen of Spades (Pikovaya dama) – (U.S.S.R.)
 Querelle, directed by Rainer Werner Fassbinder, starring Brad Davis, Franco Nero, Jeanne Moreau – (West Germany/France)
 A Question of Silence (De stilte rond Christine M.) – (Netherlands)

R
 The Return of Martin Guerre (Le Retour de Martin Guerre), starring Gérard Depardieu – (France)
 The Return of the Soldier, starring Alan Bates, Julie Christie, Glenda Jackson – (U.K.)
 Richard Pryor: Live on the Sunset Strip
 Rocky III, directed by and starring Sylvester Stallone, with Mr. T, Talia Shire, Carl Weathers, Burt Young, Burgess Meredith

S
 The Scarlet Pimpernel, starring Anthony Andrews, Ian McKellen, Jane Seymour – (U.K.)
 The Secret of NIMH, an animated film directed by Don Bluth
 The Seduction, starring Morgan Fairchild, Michael Sarrazin, Andrew Stevens and Colleen Camp
 The Sender, starring Kathryn Harrold, Željko Ivanek, Shirley Knight
 The Shadow Riders, starring Tom Selleck and Sam Elliott
 Shakti (Power), starring Dilip Kumar – (India)
 The Shaolin Temple (Shàolínsì), starring Jet Li – (Hong Kong)
 She Grazed Horses on Concrete (Pásla kone na betóne) – (Czechoslovakia)
 Shoot the Moon, directed by Alan Parker, starring Albert Finney, Diane Keaton, Peter Weller, Karen Allen
 Six Pack, starring Kenny Rogers and Diane Lane
 Six Weeks, directed by Tony Bill, starring Mary Tyler Moore and Dudley Moore
 Smithereens, directed by Susan Seidelman
 Sophie's Choice, directed by Alan J. Pakula, starring Meryl Streep, Kevin Kline, Peter MacNicol
 Soup for One, starring Saul Rubinek
 Split Image, directed by Ted Kotcheff, starring Michael O'Keefe, Karen Allen, James Woods, Brian Dennehy, Peter Fonda
 Sportloto-82 – (U.S.S.R.)
 Star Trek II: The Wrath of Khan, directed by Nicholas Meyer, starring William Shatner, Leonard Nimoy, Ricardo Montalbán
 Starstruck, directed by Gillian Armstrong – (Australia)
 The State of Things (Der Stand der Dinge), directed by Wim Wenders – (West Germany/United States/Portugal) – Golden Lion winner
 Station for Two (Vokzal dlya dvoikh) – (U.S.S.R.)
 Summer Lovers, directed by Randal Kleiser, starring Peter Gallagher, Daryl Hannah, Valérie Quennessen
 Swamp Thing, directed by Wes Craven, starring Louis Jourdan and Adrienne Barbeau
 The Sword and the Sorcerer, starring Lee Horsley
 Sword Stained with Royal Blood, directed by Chang Cheh – (Hong Kong)

T
 Tempest, directed by Paul Mazursky, starring John Cassavetes, Gena Rowlands, Molly Ringwald, Susan Sarandon
 Tenebrae, directed by Dario Argento, starring Anthony Franciosa – (Italy)
 Tenkōsei (Exchange Students) – (Japan)
 Tex, starring Matt Dillon, Emilio Estevez
 That Championship Season, starring Robert Mitchum, Bruce Dern, Stacy Keach, Paul Sorvino, Martin Sheen
 That Night in Varennes (Il mondo nuovo), starring Jean-Louis Barrault, Marcello Mastroianni, Hanna Schygulla and Harvey Keitel – (Italy/France)
The Peacock (Al Tawous), directed by Kamal El Sheikh, starring Salah Zulfikar, Nour El-Sherif and Raghda – (Egypt)
 The Thing, directed by John Carpenter, starring Kurt Russell, Keith David, David Clennon, Donald Moffat, Richard Dysart, Wilford Brimley, Charles Hallahan
 Things Are Tough All Over, starring Cheech & Chong
 Timerider: The Adventure of Lyle Swann, starring Fred Ward, Belinda Bauer, Peter Coyote
 Time Stands Still (Megáll az idő) – (Hungary)
 Tootsie, directed by Sydney Pollack, starring Dustin Hoffman, Jessica Lange, Teri Garr, Dabney Coleman, Charles Durning, Bill Murray
 Trail of the Pink Panther, starring Peter Sellers – (U.K.)
 Trick or Treats
 Tron, directed by Steven Lisberger, starring Jeff Bridges, Bruce Boxleitner, David Warner, Cindy Morgan
 The Trout (La Truite), directed by Joseph Losey, starring Isabelle Huppert, Jean-Pierre Cassel, Jeanne Moreau – (France)
 Turkey Shoot, starring Steve Railsback and Olivia Hussey – (Australia)

V
 The Verdict, directed by Sidney Lumet, starring Paul Newman, Charlotte Rampling, James Mason, Jack Warden, Milo O'Shea
 Veronika Voss, directed by Rainer Werner Fassbinder, starring Rosel Zech – (West Germany) – Golden Bear award winner
 Vice Squad, starring Season Hubley and Wings Hauser
 Victor/Victoria, directed by Blake Edwards, starring Julie Andrews, James Garner, Robert Preston, Lesley Ann Warren, Alex Karras – (US/UK)
 Visiting Hours, starring Lee Grant and William Shatner – (Canada)

W
 War and Peace (Krieg und Frieden), starring Jürgen Prochnow – (West Germany)
 Wasn't That a Time!, directed by Jim Brown
 We of the Never Never, starring Angela Punch McGregor – (Australia)
 Die Weiße Rose (The White Rose) – (West Germany)
 White Dog, directed by Samuel Fuller, starring Kristy McNichol, Paul Winfield, Jameson Parker, Burl Ives
 The Wind (Finye), directed by Souleymane Cissé – (Mali)
 The Wizard of Oz (Ozu no Mahōtsukai) – (Japan)
 Woman of Fire '82 (Hwanyeo '82) – (South Korea)
 The World According to Garp, directed by George Roy Hill, starring Robin Williams, Glenn Close, John Lithgow, Mary Beth Hurt
 The Worthless (Arvottomat), directed by Mika Kaurismäki – (Finland)
 Wrong Is Right, directed by Richard Brooks, starring Sean Connery, Katharine Ross, George Grizzard

Y
 The Year of Living Dangerously, directed by Peter Weir, starring Mel Gibson, Sigourney Weaver, Linda Hunt, Michael Murphy – (Australia)
 Yes, Giorgio, directed by Franklin J. Schaffner, starring Luciano Pavarotti and Kathryn Harrold
 Yol (The Road), directed by Yılmaz Güney – (Turkey) – Palme d'Or winner
 Young Doctors in Love, directed by Garry Marshall, starring Michael McKean and Sean Young

Z
 Zapped!, starring Scott Baio, Willie Aames, Heather Thomas

1982 Wide-release movies

January–March

April–June

July–September

October–December

Births
 January 6
Misha Omar, Malaysian actress and singer
Eddie Redmayne, English actor
 January 7 - Lauren Cohan, British-American actress
 January 8 – Gaby Hoffmann, American actress
 January 10
Josh Ryan Evans, American actor (d. 2002)
Misato Fukuen, Japanese voice actress
 January 11 - Blake Heron, American actor (d. 2017)
 January 16 - Birgitte Hjort Sørensen, Danish actress
 January 19
Tom Lorcan, English actor
Simone Missick, American actress
Jodie Sweetin, American actress
 January 24 - Daveed Diggs, American actor, rapper, singer, songwriter, screenwriter, and film producer.
 January 28 – Mirtel Pohla, Estonian actress
 February 3 - Bridget Regan, American actress
 February 5 – Yū Kobayashi, Japanese voice actress
 February 6 – Alice Eve, English actress
 February 7 – Cory Doran, Canadian voice actor and director
 February 8 – Danny Tamberelli, American actor
 February 10 – Yoshimasa Hosoya, Japanese voice actor 
 February 11 – Natalie Dormer, English actress
 February 12 – Carter Hayden, Canadian actor and voice actor
 February 22
Buğra Gülsoy, Turkish actor and director
Dichen Lachman, Australian actress and producer
 February 23 - Adam Hann-Byrd, American actor and screenwriter
 February 24 - Fala Chen, Hong Kong actress
 March 1 – Kim Min-hee, South Korean actress
 March 2 - Pilou Asbæk, Danish actor
 March 3 – Jessica Biel, American actress
 March 7 – Nora Danish, Malaysian actress
 March 10 – Thomas Middleditch, Canadian actor, voice actor, comedian and screenwriter
 March 11
Thora Birch, American actress
Robbie Daymond, American voice actor
Mircea Monroe, American actress and model
 March 12 - Lili Bordán, Hungarian-American actress
 March 14 - Kate Maberly, English actress, director, writer, producer and musician
 March 15 – Tom Budge, Australian actor 
 March 16 – Dian Sastrowardoyo, Indonesian actress
 March 18 - Adam Pally, American actor, comedian, writer and producer
 March 20 
Nick Blood, English actor
Erica Luttrell, Canadian actress
 March 21 - Santino Fontana, American actor and singer
 March 22 – Constance Wu, American actress
 March 23 - Nicolas Wright, Canadian actor and writer
 March 24 – Kenichirou Ohashi, Japanese voice actor
 March 25
Sean Faris, American actor and model
Rory Markham, American mixed martial artist and actor
Jenny Slate, American actress and comedian
 March 26 - Joe Anderson, English actor and singer
 March 28 - Flula Borg, German actor, musician, comedian, YouTube personality and DJ
 March 31
Judi Shekoni, English actress
Brian Tyree Henry, American actor
Chloé Zhao, Chinese-American director
 April 1
Sam Huntington, American actor
Taran Killam, American actor and comedian
 April 3 – Cobie Smulders, Canadian actress
 April 4 – Justin Cook, American voice actor
 April 5 – Hayley Atwell, English-American actress
 April 6 – Miguel Ángel Silvestre, Spanish actor
 April 9 – Jay Baruchel, Canadian actor-comedian 
 April 10 – Chyler Leigh, American actress
 April 11 – Remy Ishak, Malaysian actor
 April 15 – Seth Rogen, Canadian actor-comedian
 April 16 - Gina Carano, American actress
 April 19
Marta Milans, Spanish-American actress
Cassandra Lee Morris, American voice actress
Ignacio Serricchio, Argentine-born American actor
Ali Wong, Vietnamese-Chinese-American stand-up comedian, actress and writer
 April 22
 Cassidy Freeman, American actress and musician
 Noriko Shitaya, Japanese voice actress
 April 26 - Cedric Sanders, American actor
 April 28 - Harry Shum Jr., Costa Rican-American actor, singer and dancer
 April 30 – Kirsten Dunst, American actress
 May 1 – Jamie Dornan, Northern Irish actor
 May 3 – Rebecca Hall, English-American actress
 May 8 - Christina Cole, English actress
 May 11
Jonathan Jackson, American actor
Cory Monteith, Canadian actor and musician (d. 2013)
 May 14 - Anjelah Johnson, American actress and comedian
 May 20 – Donald Reignoux, French voice actor
 May 24 - Chaunté Wayans, American actress, comedian, writer and editor
 May 29 - Anita Briem, Icelandic actress
 May 31
Lee Majdoub, Canadian actor
Jonathan Tucker, American actor
 June 2 – Jewel Staite, Canadian actress
 June 4 - MC Jin, American rapper, actor and comedian of Chinese descent
 June 5 – Yoo In-na, South Korean actress
 June 8 - Josh Pence, American actor
 June 16
Missy Peregrym, Canadian actress
Jodi Sta. Maria, Filipina actress
 June 17 – Ursula Ratasepp, Estonian actress
 June 21
Benjamin Walker, American actor
Jussie Smollett, American actor
 June 24 - Laura Donnelly, Northern Irish actress
 June 27
Polo Ravales, Filipino actor and model
Takeru Shibaki, Japanese actor
 June 29
 Matthew Mercer, American voice actor
 Ott Sepp, Estonian actor
 June 30 – Lizzy Caplan, American actress
 July 1 – Hilarie Burton, American actress
 July 6 - Misty Upham, Native American actress (d. 2014)
 July 8
Sophia Bush, American actress
Schuyler Fisk, American singer-songwriter and actress
 July 9 – Toby Kebbell, English actor
 July 18 – Priyanka Chopra, Indian actress
 July 19
Jared Padalecki, American actor
Derek Wilson (actor), American actor
 July 23
Zanjoe Marudo, Filipino actor
Tom Mison, English actor 
Paul Wesley, American actor
 July 24
 Elisabeth Moss, American actress
 Anna Paquin, New Zealand actress
 July 25 – Brad Renfro, American actor (d. 2008)
 July 29 - Allison Mack, American actress
 July 30
Brandon Scott (actor), American actor and producer
Martin Starr, American actor 
Yvonne Strahovski, Australian actress
 August 1 – Ai Tominaga, Japanese model and actress
 August 6 – Romola Garai, English actress
 August 7 – Abbie Cornish, Australian actress
 August 10 – Devon Aoki, American actress and model
 August 13 – Sebastian Stan, Romanian-American actor
 August 16
Cam Gigandet, American actor
Todd Haberkorn, American voice actor
 August 19 – Erika Christensen, American actress
 August 20 – Jamil Walker Smith, American actor
 August 21 – Akane Omae, Japanese voice actress
 August 25 – Benjamin Diskin, American voice actor
 August 26 - John Mulaney, American stand-up comedian, actor, writer and producer
 August 28 - LeAnn Rimes, American singer-songwriter and actress
 September 3 – Ayumi Fujimura, Japanese voice actress
 September 4
Shaheizy Sam, Malaysian actor
Sarah Solemani, English actress and writer
 September 7 – Ryoko Shiraishi, Japanese voice actress
 September 10 – Bret Iwan, American voice actor
 September 13
Ben McKay, British actor
J. G. Quintel, American animator, television writer and voice actor
 September 19 – Columbus Short, American actor and dancer
 September 20
JJ Jia, Hong Kong actress
Hu Ge, Chinese actor
 September 22
Katie Lowes, American actress
Billie Piper, English singer and actress
 September 25 - Charlene Amoia, American actress
 September 27 – Anna Camp, American actress and singer
 September 28 – Ranbir Kapoor, Indian actor
 September 30
Lacey Chabert, American actress
Kieran Culkin, American actor
 October 3 - Erik von Detten, former American actor
 October 10 – Dan Stevens, British actor
 October 13 – Jo Yoon-hee, South Korean actress and model
 October 15 
Imran Abbas, Pakistani actor and model
Jessica Rey, American actress
Lane Toran, American actor, voice actor, musician and songwriter
 October 23 – Bradley Pierce, American actor
 October 27 – Patrick Fugit, American actor
 October 28 - Matt Smith, English actor
 October 29 - Chelan Simmons, Canadian actress and former professional model
 October 30 - Clémence Poésy, French actress and model
 October 31 – Justin Chatwin, Canadian actor
 November 2 - Kyoko Fukada, Japanese actress and singer
 November 4 - Travis Van Winkle, American actor
 November 10 – Heather Matarazzo, American actress
 November 11 - Fayssal Bazzi, Australian actor
 November 12 – Anne Hathaway, American actress
 November 18
Akeno Watanabe, Japanese voice actress
Damon Wayans Jr., American actor, comedian and writer
 November 21 – Ryan Carnes, American actor
 November 22 - Fiona Glascott, Irish actress
 November 24 - Joey Ansah, British actor, director and martial artist
 November 25 - Natalia Cordova-Buckley, Mexican-American actress
 November 28 - Alan Ritchson, American actor, filmmaker and singer
 November 29
Lucas Black, American actor
Gemma Chan, English actress
 November 30 – Elisha Cuthbert, Canadian actress
 December 1
Riz Ahmed, British actor and rapper
Jonny Cruz, American actor, scriptwriter, producer, filmmaker and musician
 December 3
Jaycee Chan, American-born Hong Kong actor and singer
Dascha Polanco, Dominican-American actress
 December 5 - Gabriel Luna, American actor and producer
 December 7
Jack Huston, British actor
Jesse Johnson, American actor  
 December 8
Nicki Minaj, American rapper
Hannah Ware, English actress
 December 15
Charlie Cox, English actor
Ester Dean, American singer and actress
George O. Gore II, American actor
 December 16 - Justin Mentell, American actor (d. 2010)
 December 24 
Robert Schwartzman, American actor, screenwriter, director, and musician
Tetsuya Kakihara, Japanese voice actor
 December 28 - Beau Garrett, American actress and model
 December 29 – Alison Brie, American actress
 December 30 – Kristin Kreuk, Canadian actress

Deaths

Film debuts 
Caroline Aaron – Come Back to the 5 & Dime, Jimmy Dean, Jimmy Dean
Kirstie Alley – Star Trek II: The Wrath of Khan
Richard Dean Anderson – Young Doctors in Love
Antonio Banderas – Labyrinth of Passion
Christine Baranski – Soup for One
Ellen Barkin – Diner
Michael Bowen – Forbidden World
Nicolas Cage – Fast Times at Ridgemont High
Glenn Close – The World According to Garp
Geena Davis – Tootsie
Shannen Doherty – Night Shift
Christine Ebersole – Tootsie
Erika Eleniak – E.T. the Extra-Terrestrial
Miguel Ferrer – Truckin' Buddy McCoy
Hugh Grant – Privileged
Anthony Michael Hall – Six Pack
Linda Hamilton – Tag: The Assassination Game
Paul Herman – Dear Mr. Wonderful
Hulk Hogan – Rocky III
C. Thomas Howell – E.T. the Extra-Terrestrial
Angelina Jolie – Lookin' to Get Out
Julie Kavner – National Lampoon's Movie Madness
Kevin Kline – Sophie's Choice
Jet Li – Shaolin Temple
Amy Madigan – Love Child
Michael Madsen – Against All Hope
Rebecca De Mornay – One from the Heart
Eddie Murphy – 48 Hrs.
Gary Oldman – Remembrance
Ed O'Ross – Dear Mr. Wonderful
Michael Richards – Young Doctors in Love
Molly Ringwald – Tempest
James Russo – A Stranger Is Watching
William Sadler – Hanky Panky
Meredith Salenger – Annie
Greta Scacchi – 
Shawnee Smith - Annie
Eric Stoltz – Fast Times at Ridgemont High
Forest Whitaker – Tag: The Assassination Game
James Wilby – Privileged
Mark Williams – Privileged
Daphne Zuniga – The Dorm That Dripped Blood

See also
 List of American films of 1982
 List of British films of 1982
 List of French films of 1982
 List of German films of the 1980s
 List of Bollywood films of 1982
 List of Italian films of 1982
 List of Japanese films of 1982
 List of Swedish films of the 1980s

Notes

References

 
Film by year